General Yorke may refer to:

Charles Yorke (British Army officer) (1790–1880), British Army general
John Yorke (British Army officer) (1814–1890), British Army general
Joseph Yorke, 1st Baron Dover (1724–1792), British Army general

See also
Zebulon York (1819–1900), Confederate States Army brigadier general